Kade Point is a point separating Ice Fjord and Wilson Harbor on the south coast of South Georgia. Kade Point is an established name dating back to about 1912.

References

Headlands of South Georgia